Yrjö Sotiola (19 May 1913 – 1 June 1992) was a Finnish footballer. He played in eleven matches for the Finland national football team from 1935 to 1948. He was also part of Finland's squad for the football tournament at the 1936 Summer Olympics, but he did not play in any matches. He played his whole club career for Helsingin Palloseura in first and second tiers of Finnish football pyramid. In premier league he played 179 games and scored 60 goals. He won finnish football championship in 1934 and 1935 seasons.

References

External links
 

1913 births
1992 deaths
Finnish footballers
Finland international footballers
Footballers from Helsinki
Association football forwards